Eugenia is a genus of plants.

Eugenia may also refer to:

 Eugenia, Ontario, Canada
 Eugenia (given name), and persons bearing it
 Eugenia (Lady of Quality), a pseudonym used by an unknown 18th century protofeminist pamphleteer
 Eugenia (telenovela), in Mexico
 The Eugenia, a 1964 English contract law case
 Eugenia metro station, in Mexico City, Mexico
 Eugenia (Mexico City Metrobús), a BRT station in Mexico City
 SS Eugenia, 1950s and '60s name for 
 45 Eugenia, an asteroid
 Eugenia (Joplin), a 1906 composition by Scott Joplin

See also
 Eugenius (disambiguation)
 Eugene (disambiguation)